Casino Nova Scotia is located in Nova Scotia, Canada, and has locations in Halifax and Sydney. Steelman Partners designed Casino Nova Scotia and its sister casino Sydney Casino.

Halifax casino

The Casino Nova Scotia opened a temporary location in the Sheraton Hotel Halifax on June 1, 1995. On April 24, 2000 it moved to a brand new, $100-million "Vegas-style" facility on the downtown Halifax waterfront. It was originally owned by Caesar's until October 2005, when Casino Nova Scotia was bought out by Great Canadian Gaming Corporation. When the Casino was sold to Great Canadian Gaming the affiliated Sheraton Hotel was sold separately to the Marriott Corporation. In 2007, workers at the casino voted in favor of organizing a labour union.

The casino has 650 slots and table games. There is an attached 550-car parkade, including 14 wheelchair-accessible spaces.

The casino is connected via pedway to the Marriott Halifax Harbourfront, formerly the Casino Nova Scotia Hotel and Sheraton Hotel Halifax. The pedway also connects to Purdy's Wharf, Scotia Square, and the downtown core.

Restaurants and lounges
There are several drinking and dining facilities in the casino, including nightly buffets and Sunday Brunch buffet in the 3Sixty Buffet Restaurant, casual dining and live entertainment in the 3Sixty Lounge, and concerts, conventions and other attractions in the Compass Room and the Schooner room.

Structural engineering
Engineered by BMR of Halifax, the casino has been described as one of the most complicated in the company's history. The size of the site meant that part of the building was built over water 70 feet deep (at its deepest point). Most of the land that the casino occupies had been created years earlier when that part of Halifax Harbour was infilled with loose rock and excavation material from other construction sites — reclaimed land was too soft to serve as a stable building foundation. BMR overcame the problem by engineering a design which incorporated driving caissons through the fill material and into the bedrock below. Then, using a specially designed doughnut-shaped pile cap as a support system, the engineers worked with the form work contractor to hang the casino's floor structure on the supporting caissons like a huge wharf.

Sydney casino
Casino Nova Scotia added a sister casino in Sydney on August 1, 1995. The casino, located on George St. in downtown Sydney, was constructed as an addition to the city's Centre 200.

See also
 List of casinos in Canada
 Halifax, Nova Scotia
 Downtown Halifax
 Downtown Halifax Link
 Citadel Hill

References

External links
 Official Website of Casino Nova Scotia

Buildings and structures in Halifax, Nova Scotia
Casinos in Nova Scotia
Music venues in Halifax, Nova Scotia